Jim Hay (born 8 August 1964) is a former Scotland international rugby union player. He played as hooker.

Rugby Union career

Amateur career

He played for Hawick. He made his senior debut aged 16.

Provincial and professional career

He played for and captained the South of Scotland district side.

When the Scottish rugby union game turned professional in 1996, Hay signed a professional SRU contract. He then played for the Border Reivers.

International career

Hay was capped by Scotland 'B' on 18 February 1989 to play against France 'B'.

He received his only senior cap in 1995 against Samoa on 18 November at Murrayfield Stadium.

Coaching career

He coached Gala. He resigned in 2000, after only a year in the role.

He coached Hawick but was sacked in 2008.

Media career

He was a rugby union commentator for Scottish Television.

Business career

He now runs an estate agents in Hawick.

References

1964 births
Scottish rugby union players
Scotland international rugby union players
Hawick RFC players
Scotland 'B' international rugby union players
South of Scotland District (rugby union) players
Rugby union hookers
Border Reivers players
Living people